Norwich Rowing Club is a rowing club on the River Yare based at Whitlingham Boathouses, Whitlingham Lane, Trowse, Norwich and is affiliated to British Rowing.

History
The club was founded in 1972.

The club has produced five British champion crews.

Honours

British champions

References

Sport in Norfolk
Norwich
Rowing clubs in England